Mitrella hernandezi is a species of sea snail in the family Columbellidae, the dove snails.

References

hernandezi
Gastropods described in 2005